Integration Objects is a software development firm created in 2002. The company is a systems integrator and solutions provider for knowledge management, automation and plant process management and decision support applications. It develops OPC software products and knowledge management platforms for manufacturers primarily in the oil and gas, refining and petrochemicals, chemical, food and beverage, steel and pharmaceutical industries. It also provides consulting services.

Integration Objects is a member of the OPC Foundation, the International Society of Automation and MIMOSA. It has also collaborated and partnered with other IT companies such as Invensys, OSIsoft, Gensym, and ABB for large projects and its clients include ExxonMobil, Saudi Aramco and Solvay Chemicals.

Notes 

2002 establishments in Tunisia
Software companies established in 2002
Interoperability
Enterprise application integration
Interoperable communications
Software architecture
Knowledge management
Tunisian brands
Software companies of Tunisia